Ralph Bernal (2 October 1783 or 2 October 1784 – 26 August 1854) was a British Whig politician and art collector.

His parents, Jacob Israel Bernal and wife Leah da Silva, were Sephardi Jews of Spanish and Portuguese origin, but he was baptised at St Olave Hart Street in London. His father was a merchant.

During his youth he became an actor and he performed to acclaim in several works by William Shakespeare, during which time he gained a reputation for oratory. He was Member of Parliament (MP) for Lincoln 1818–20 and MP for Rochester from 1820 to 1841 and again from 1847 to 1852. From 1842 to 1847 he was MP for Weymouth and Melcombe Regis.

According to the Legacies of British Slave-Ownership at the University College London, Bernal was awarded a payment as a slave trader in the aftermath of the Slavery Abolition Act 1833 with the Slave Compensation Act 1837. The British Government took out a £15 million loan (worth £ in ) with interest from Nathan Mayer Rothschild and Moses Montefiore which was subsequently paid off by the British taxpayers (ending in 2015). Bernal was associated with three different claims, he owned 564 slaves in Jamaica and received a £11,458 payment at the time (worth £ in ).

Bernal was president of the British Archaeological Association in 1853. He built up a substantial collection of glass, ceramics and other art objects, which were auctioned after his death, with the 4,000 lots selling for £70,000.

He married Ann Elizabeth White in April 1806. His eldest son was Ralph Bernal Osborne (1808–1882), a politician, who took on the surname Osborne on marrying the daughter of Sir Thomas Osborne, 9th Baronet.

References

External links
 

1780s births
1854 deaths
British male stage actors
Whig (British political party) MPs for English constituencies
Members of the Parliament of the United Kingdom for English constituencies
UK MPs 1820–1826
UK MPs 1826–1830
UK MPs 1830–1831
UK MPs 1831–1832
UK MPs 1832–1835
UK MPs 1835–1837
UK MPs 1837–1841
UK MPs 1841–1847
British people of Spanish-Jewish descent
Politics of Lincoln, England
19th-century British male actors
British people of Portuguese-Jewish descent
Jewish British politicians
Recipients of payments from the Slavery Abolition Act 1833
British slave owners
British Sephardi Jews
Spanish and Portuguese Jews